Gerald Arthur James Balfour, 4th Earl of Balfour (23 December 1925 – 27 June 2003), styled Viscount Traprain between 1945 and 1968, was a British peer.

Balfour was the son of The 3rd Earl of Balfour and Jean Lily West Roundel Cooke-Yarborough. He married Natasha Georgina Anton (d. 1994), daughter of Captain George Anton, on 14 December 1956.

Balfour was educated at Eton. He took part in the Second World War, in the Merchant Navy. From 1960 to 1974, he was a County Councillor for East Lothian. In November 1968 he succeeded his father in the earldom.

As Balfour and his wife had no children, Balfour was succeeded in the earldom by his second cousin once removed Roderick Balfour.

References
 Peter W. Hammond, editor, The Complete Peerage or a History of the House of Lords and All its Members From the Earliest Times, Volume XIV: Addenda & Corrigenda (Stroud, Gloucestershire, U.K.: Sutton Publishing, 1998), page 692
 Announcements, The Daily Telegraph, London, U.K., 30 June 2003
 Charles Mosley, editor, Burke's Peerage and Baronetage, 106th edition, 2 volumes (Crans, Switzerland: Burke's Peerage (Genealogical Books) Ltd, 1999), volume 1, page 172

External links

Judgments - Earl of Balfour (Appellant) v Keeper of The Registers of Scotland and Others (Respondents) (Scotland) part 1
Judgments - Earl of Balfour (Appellant) v Keeper of The Registers of Scotland and Others (Respondents) (Scotland) part 2

1925 births
2003 deaths
People educated at Eton College
Councillors in Scotland
4
British Merchant Navy personnel of World War II

Balfour